Richard Wentworth  (born 1947) is a British artist, curator and teacher.

Life and career

Wentworth was born in Samoa—then a province of New Zealand—in 1947. He studied art at Hornsey College of Art in North London from 1965, and then at the Royal College of Art where he was a contemporary of Zoë Wanamaker and Tony Scott.

Between 1971 and 1987, Wentworth taught at Goldsmiths College and his influence has been claimed in the work of the Young British Artists.  From 2002 to 2010, Wentworth was 'Master of Drawing' at the Ruskin School of Drawing and Fine Art, Oxford University and was the head of the Sculpture department at The Royal College of Art, London from 2009 - 2011.

In August 2014, Wentworth was one of 200 public figures who were signatories to a letter to The Guardian opposing Scottish independence in the run-up to September's referendum on that issue.

Making Do and Getting By

Since the early 1970s Wentworth has been capturing chance encounters of oddities and discrepancies in the modern landscape in the ongoing photographic series known as Making Do and Getting By. Mundane snapshots and fragments of the modern landscape are elevated to an analysis of human resourcefulness and improvisation, whereby amusing oddities that would otherwise go by unnoticed become the subject of intense contemplation.

New British Sculpture

In the early 1980s Wentworth became identified with the New British Sculpture movement. Wentworth’s interest is the juxtaposition of materials and found elements that do not belong together. In the work Shower, Wentworth attached a small propeller to an ordinary table creating the impression that the furniture is about to take flight. For his 1995 solo show at the Lisson Gallery he created False Ceiling a flock of books suspended by wire from the gallery’s ceiling. For Art and Sacred Places in Winchester Cathedral he created Recall which speculated how the structure of the Cathedral might have been supported during its construction.  Wentworth is also interested in the bizarre coincidences of urban life. His ongoing series of photographs, Making Do and Getting By (1974 onwards), captures the provisional ways in which people modify their local environment. In April 2010, Wentworth participated in a major sculpture exhibition curated by Peter Kardia entitled "From Floor to Sky", alongside artists Roderick Coyne and Alison Wilding.

He is represented in London by Lisson Gallery and in New York City by Peter Freeman, Inc.

Exhibitions

Wentworth has lived for many years in the Kings Cross area of London and in 2002 he realised the Artangel project An Area of Outstanding Unnatural Beauty in which for three months he took over a plumbing supply shop in the area converting it into a base for visitors to explore and engage with the area.

In 1996, his Marking the Parish Boundaries along the River Tees in County Durham was the first public art project to be funded by the National Lottery.

Major solo presentations include Galerie Azzedine Alaïa, Paris, France (2017), Bold Tendencies, Peckham, London, UK (2015), Black Maria with Gruppe, Kings Cross, London, UK (2013), Whitechapel Gallery, London, UK (2010), 52nd Venice Biennale, Venice, Italy (2009), TATE, Liverpool, UK (2005), Artangel, London, UK (2002), Bonner Kunstverein, Bonn, Germany (1998), Stedelijk Museum, Amsterdam, The Netherlands (1994), Serpentine Gallery, London, UK (1993).

Curatorial projects

In July 2009, he curated the Lisson Gallery's Summer show  oule to Braid featuring a large number of works from his personal collection and that of Lisson director Nicholas Logsdail.

In 2000, together with Fischli & Weiss and Gabriel Orozco he worked in "Aprendiendo menos" (Learning Less), curated by Patricia Martín and presented in Centro de la Imagen, Mexico city. Three different perspectives through photography, where the artists are a means to portray street findings within the urban landscape, its surroundings and its objects.

In 1998 - 99 he curated Thinking Aloud, a national Touring exhition organised by the Hayward Gallery at Kettle's Yard, Cambridge and Camden Arts Centre, London that explored the creative process as well as the profligate nature of mass production and consumerism.

Honours

Wentworth was appointed Commander of the Order of the British Empire (CBE) in the 2011 New Year Honours for services to art.

References and notes

External links
Lisson Gallery: Richard Wentworth
Tate: Richard Wentworth
Tate Liverpool: Richard Wentworth
BBC audio interview (02/2006)
Interview (Spring/1999)
Interview (04/1997)
Galería NoguerasBlanchard: Richard Wentworth

British curators
1947 births
Living people
20th-century British sculptors
British male sculptors
21st-century British sculptors
21st-century male artists
Academics of the Royal College of Art
Alumni of the Royal College of Art
Commanders of the Order of the British Empire
English contemporary artists
20th-century British male artists
21st-century British male artists